Annette Kay Main  (born 1951/1952) is a New Zealand local-body politician. She served as mayor of Whanganui from 2010 to 2016, and was the first woman to hold that office.

Early life and family
Main was born in Castlecliff in Whanganui and attended Castlecliff School and Whanganui High School. She trained as a teacher, before becoming a parent. She worked for New Zealand Post in their public relations department, for the Whanganui District Council as a tourism officer, and then ran a tourism business.

Political career
In 1998 main was elected to the Manawatū-Whanganui Regional Council, where she served for 12 years. During that time she chaired the environment committee and served as deputy chair.

In 2010 she was elected mayor of Whanganui, becoming the first woman to hold the position. She was re-elected in 2013. As mayor, she supported the New Zealand Geographic board's decision to change the town's name to include an "h". She did not stand for re-election in 2016, instead successfully pursuing a seat on the Whanganui District Health Board.

Main was appointed an Officer of the New Zealand Order of Merit, for services to local government, in the 2017 New Year Honours. In 2018 she was appointed to the council of the Universal College of Learning.

References

1950s births
Living people
Mayors of Wanganui
People from Whanganui
Women mayors of places in New Zealand
Year of birth uncertain
Whanganui District Health Board members